The third HMS Hoste (K566), ex-Mitchell, was a Captain-class frigate of the Evarts-class of destroyer escort, originally commissioned to be built for the United States Navy. Before she was finished in 1943, she was transferred to the Royal Navy under the terms of Lend-Lease, and saw service during the World War II from 1943 to 1945.

Construction and transfer
The still-unnamed ship was laid down as the U.S. Navy destroyer escort DE-521 at the Boston Navy Yard in Boston, Massachusetts, on 14 August 1943 and was launched on 24 September 1943. On 9 October 1943, she was allocated to the United Kingdom and received the British name Mitchell, but the British changed her name to Hoste on 5 November 1943. Upon completion on 3 December 1943, she was christened, sponsored by Mrs. D. W. Mitchell, and transferred to the United Kingdom.

Service history

Royal Navy, 1943–1945
Commissioned into service in the Royal Navy as HMS Hoste (K566) on 3 December 1943 simultaneously with her transfer, the ship served on patrol and escort duty for the remainder of World War II. The Royal Navy returned her to the U.S. Navy at Harwich, England, on 22 August 1945.

U.S. Navy, 1945
Retaining her British name, the ship was commissioned into the U.S. Navy as USS Hoste (DE-521) on 22 August 1945 at Harwich simultaneously with her return to U.S. custody. She departed Harwich on 29 August 1945 and proceeded to the Philadelphia Navy Yard at Philadelphia, Pennsylvania, where she arrived on 9 September 1945. She was decommissioned there on 23 October 1945.

Disposal
Hoste was sold for scrapping in June 1946. Her date of scrapping was 7 May 1947.

References

External links
 Painting of HMS Hoste (K566)

Drury at Uboat.net
Hoste at Captain class frigate association

 

Captain-class frigates
Evarts-class destroyer escorts
World War II frigates of the United Kingdom
World War II frigates and destroyer escorts of the United States
Ships built in Boston
1943 ships